The Mogo Creek, a perennial stream of the Hawkesbury-Nepean catchment, is located in the Blue Mountains region of New South Wales, Australia.

Course
The river descends  over its  course.

See also

 List of rivers of Australia
 List of rivers in New South Wales (L-Z)
 Rivers of New South Wales

References

Rivers of New South Wales
Hawkesbury River
City of Hawkesbury